Mineola may refer to:

Populated places

United States
 Mineola, Arkansas
 Mineola, former name of Alleene, Arkansas
 Mineola, Georgia
 Mineola, Iowa
 Mineola, Missouri
 Mineola, New York
 Mineola, Texas

Canada
 Mineola, British Columbia, a ghost town
 Mineola, a neighbourhood in Mississauga, Ontario

Schools
 Mineola High School (New York)
 Mineola Union Free School District, New York
 Mineola Colored High School, Texas
 Mineola High School (Texas)
 Mineola Independent School District, Texas

Other
 Mineola (moth genus)

See also
 Mineola station (disambiguation), railroad stations of the name
 Minneola (disambiguation)